The lac Le Gardeur (English: Le Gardeur Lake) is a freshwater body in the head area of the Sainte-Anne Ouest River in the unorganized territory of Lac-Croche , in the La Jacques-Cartier Regional County Municipality, in the administrative region of Capitale-Nationale, in the province from Quebec, to Canada. This body of water is located southwest of the Laurentides Wildlife Reserve.

The southern part of the lake is served by a forest road and another pass on the east side.

Forestry is the main economic activity in the sector; recreotourism activities, second.

The surface of Lac Le Gardeur is usually frozen from the beginning of December to the end of March, however the safe circulation on the ice is generally from mid-December to mid-March.

Geography 
This lake between the mountains is made like an inverted U. A peninsula attached to the south shore stretches north .

Lac Le Gardeur is supplied with water on the northwest side by the outlet of the Sainte-Anne Ouest River (outlet of Fairchild Lake), as well as by the outlet (coming from the northeast) of Lakes Runan and Mancion.

Toponymy 
The toponym Lac Le Gardeur was formalized on December 5, 1968, by the Commission de toponymie du Québec.

See also 
 St. Lawrence River
 List of lakes of Canada

References

Bibliography

External links 
 

Lakes of Capitale-Nationale
La Jacques-Cartier Regional County Municipality